XHSJI-FM is a radio station on 88.3 FM in San José Iturbide, Guanajuato. It is owned by Corporación Bajío Comunicaciones and known as Radio Lobo. The station broadcasts from a tower on Cerrito Galomo near San José Iturbide.

History
XHSJI was awarded in the IFT-4 radio auction of 2017 as XHPJIT-FM; the call letters were changed in 2018 before signing on. The station signed on in 2019.

References

Radio stations in Guanajuato
Radio stations established in 2019
2019 establishments in Mexico